Hongta District is the main district of Yuxi, Yunnan Province, China.

Administrative divisions
The county government of Yuxi City is seated in Hongta District.

Hongta District has 9 subdistricts and 2 ethnic townships. 
9 subdistricts

2 ethnic townships
 Xiaoshiqiao Yi
 Luohe Yi

Ethnic groups
The Yuxi City Almanac (1993:189) lists the following ethnic groups.

Yi
Naisupo  (in the east)
Niesupo  (in the west)
Lalu 
Sani 
Bula 
Xiangtang 
Ache 
Bai (Sadu)
Hani: pop. 972 (1987), in Meichong village , Hongta District

Transportation 
Yuxi railway station is located here.

References

External links
Hongta District Official Website

County-level divisions of Yuxi